Neotephritis paludosae is a species of tephritid or fruit flies in the genus Neotephritis of the family Tephritidae.

Distribution
Hawaiian Islands.

References

Tephritinae
Insects described in 1980
Diptera of South America